Rodnik is a brand of Russian vodka. The brand's distillery is in Samara, Russia.

History 
The distillery was founded in 1895.

References 

Russian vodkas